Carson P. Cooman (born June 12, 1982, Rochester, New York) is an American composer and organist.

Cooman was first given piano lessons as a three-year-old and began studying organ under Bruce Klanderman at age ten. He graduated from Allendale Columbia School and then studied music at Harvard University. He then went on to study at Carnegie Mellon University, studying with Bernard Rands and Judith Weir.

Cooman is a prolific composer, having composed almost 1,000 works by the time he reached age thirty. As a performer, he tours as a professional organist concentrating on the performance of modern composers; he has premiered more than one hundred works for organ.

Cooman also writes on music, having been editor of the Living Music Journal from 2005 to 2009 and a frequent contributor to the music publication Fanfare. He is currently composer-in-residence at Harvard Memorial Church.

In 2018, Cooman wrote Two Orgelkids Pieces, specially composed for the so-called "Do-organ" of Orgelkids. One of the compositions is dedicated to Lydia Vroegindeweij, who started Orgelkids in 2009.

Footnotes

References
Walter Simmons, "Carson Cooman". The New Grove Dictionary of American Music, 2nd edition (rev. May 28, 2015, Oxford Music Online).
M. Power, "A Minimum of Means". Choir and Organ 15 (2007), pp. 15–17.

External links
Official website of Carson Cooman

American classical organists
American male organists
American male classical composers
Harvard University alumni
American classical composers
Musicians from Rochester, New York
Carnegie Mellon University alumni
20th-century organists
20th-century classical composers
21st-century organists
21st-century classical composers
21st-century American composers
1982 births
Living people
20th-century American composers
21st-century American keyboardists
Male classical organists